Hit Factory is a compilation album of songs by the Monkees, released by Pair Records in 1985 and licensed from Arista Records. The album was available as a two-record set or single cassette and sold surprisingly well the year following its release, after the Pleasant Valley Sunday MTV marathon of their television series in February 1986 reawakened interest in the Monkees.

Despite its title, the album did not include a full selection of hit singles, instead featuring a mixture of hits, B-sides and album tracks, including then-rarely heard songs from the Monkees' 1968 film Head and their 1969 albums Instant Replay and The Monkees Present. The Billboard chart hit "Tapioca Tundra" makes its U.S. compilation debut here.

The photo of the band used on the cover is a flipped image from the original.

Track listing

References

The Monkees compilation albums
1985 compilation albums